Lokomotiv Kharkiv  is a Ukrainian professional men's volleyball team, based in Kharkiv, playing in Ukrainian Super League.

Achievements

Domestic 
 Ukrainian Super League
  (x17) 1994, 1996, 2001, 2002, 2003, 2004, 2005, 2007, 2009, 2010, 2011, 2012, 2013, 2014, 2015, 2016, 2017
  (x4) 1992, 1995, 2008, 2018
  (x1) 2000
 Vyshcha Liha
  (x1) 2019
 Ukrainian Cup
  (x13) 2001, 2002, 2004, 2006, 2007, 2008, 2009, 2010, 2011, 2012, 2013, 2014, 2015, 2016
  (x2) 2017, 2018
 Soviet Championship
   (x1) 1978

European 
 CEV Cup
  Winner (1) 2003–04

Season by season

Team roster
Team roster in season 2020-21

Starting lineup in season 2020-21

Technical staff

Squad changes 2020/2021

In 
 Pylyp Harmash from  Știința
 Dmytro Burma from  Burevisnyk
 Dmytro Kozlovskyi from  Epicentr-Podoliany
 Maksym Hrytsyk from  VC MHP-Vinnytsia Trostianets

Out 
 Yevhen Kapaiev to  Reshetylivka
 Dmytro Starchikov to  Reshetylivka
 Yevhen Politko to  MHP-Vinnytsia Trostianets
 Denys Veletskyi to  Kaposvár
 Stanislav Zalizko to  Pokuttia
 Pylyp Harmash to  Yurydychna Akademiya

 

Team roster in season 2019-20

Notable players
Notable, former or current players of the club.

References

External links
Official site

Ukrainian volleyball clubs
Sport in Kharkiv